The 2017–18 Bangladesh Tri-Nation Series was a cricket tournament that took place in January 2018. It was a tri-nation series between Bangladesh, Sri Lanka and Zimbabwe, with all the matches played as One Day Internationals (ODIs). The Sher-e-Bangla National Cricket Stadium hosted all the matches, with each fixture starting at noon. The second ODI was the 100th to be played at the venue and in the third match, Bangladesh recorded their biggest win in ODIs, beating Sri Lanka by 163 runs.

The final was played between hosts Bangladesh and Sri Lanka. Sri Lanka won the match by 79 runs, with Sri Lankan bowler Shehan Madushanka taking a hat-trick on debut. Following the tri-series, Sri Lanka played two Test matches and two Twenty20 Internationals (T20Is) against Bangladesh.

Squads

After the second ODI, Dinesh Chandimal captained Sri Lanka as Angelo Mathews ruled out of the series due to hamstring injury. Sadeera Samarawickrama was added to Sri Lanka's squad as cover for Mathews. After the third ODI, Imrul Kayes was dropped from Bangladesh's squad. However, before the final match, he was added back to squad. Kusal Perera suffered an injury during the fourth ODI and was ruled out of the rest of the series. Dhananjaya de Silva replaced him in Sri Lanka's squad.

Points table

1st ODI

2nd ODI

3rd ODI

4th ODI

5th ODI

6th ODI

Final

Notes

References

External links
 Series home at ESPN Cricinfo

2018 in Bangladeshi cricket
2018 in Sri Lankan cricket
2018 in Zimbabwean cricket
International cricket competitions in 2017–18
Sri Lankan cricket tours of Bangladesh
Zimbabwean cricket tours of Bangladesh
Bangladesh Tri-Nation Series